The Frosty Leo Nebula is a protoplanetary nebula (PPN) located roughly at 3000 light-years away from Earth in the direction of the constellation Leo. It is a spectral bipolar nebula. Its central star is of optical spectral type K7II, by itself called Frosty Leo. It is unusual in that it has an extremely deep absorption feature at 3.1 μm and is unusually located at more than 900 pc above the plane of our galaxy.  Further, as of 1990, it has the only known PPN circumstellar outflow in which crystalline ice dominates the long-wavelength emission spectrum and the only known PPN with point-reflection-symmetric deviations from axial symmetry.

Characteristics
The Frosty Leo Nebula has two lobes that are separated by 2 between which is an almost edge-on dust ring.  It also has two relatively faint but prominent compact nebulosities, or ansae, separated by ~23 along the polar axis of the PPN. The PPN as a whole has an hourglass like shape.  It has an inclination angle of 15° relative to the plane of the sky.  Its molecular envelope is expanding at a rate of ~25 km/s.

Observation history

This PPN was first noticed in the IRAS survey due to its exceptionally cold IRAS color temperatures. It also has a uniquely sharp maximum at 60-μM.

Point symmetry
It is the first bipolar PPN known to have point reflection symmetry (all others being axially symmetric).  Point symmetry is a fairly common trait of planetary nebulae as found in NGC 2022, NGC 2371-2, NGC 6309, Cat's Eye Nebula, NGC 6563, Dumbbell Nebula, Saturn Nebula, A24, and Hb5.  postulate that point symmetry is either due to the bipolar outflow being directed by a precessing disc or a precessing common envelope binary.

Naming
 dubbed IRAS 09371+1212 as the "Frosty Leo Nebula" because of their interpretation of the object's extremely unusual far infrared spectrum that water is largely depleted in its gaseous state by ice condensation into grains and for its location in the Leo constellation.  Their interpretation was subsequently verified in 1988 by three independent papers.   further observed in the band between 35 and 65 μM that very cold (<50 K) silicate dust grains, abundantly coated with crystalline ice, are responsible for the 60-μM excess.

Notes

References

External links

 Image of Frosty Leo Nebula.

Protoplanetary nebulae
Leo (constellation)